Schinopsis haenkeana is a species of plant in the family Anacardiaceae. It is found in Argentina and Bolivia. Its vernacular names include quebracho blanco, horco quebracho.

References

haenkeana
Trees of Argentina
Trees of Bolivia
Vulnerable plants
Taxonomy articles created by Polbot